The 1928 United States presidential election in New Hampshire took place on November 6, 1928, as part of the 1928 United States presidential election which was held throughout all contemporary 48 states. Voters chose four representatives, or electors to the Electoral College, who voted for president and vice president. 

New Hampshire voted for the Republican nominee, Secretary of Commerce Herbert Hoover of California, over the Democratic nominee, Governor Alfred E. Smith of New York. Hoover's running mate was Senate Majority Leader Charles Curtis of Kansas, while Smith ran with Senator Joseph Taylor Robinson of Arkansas.

Hoover won New Hampshire by a margin of 17.63%, almost exactly the same as his national figure, though a decline upon Calvin Coolidge’s 1924 margin. He also became the first ever Republican to win the White House without carrying Hillsborough County.

Results

Results by county

See also
 United States presidential elections in New Hampshire

References

New Hampshire
1928
1928 New Hampshire elections